This is a list of Princesses of Brazil, from 1645 to 1815, both by marriage and birth.  The title was preceded by the titles Princess of Portugal and succeeded by Princess Royal of Portugal.

The title was created by King John IV of Portugal on 27 October 1645 in favor of his eldest son and heir Infante Teodósio, soon after Portugal had gotten rid of its Spanish rulers. During the 1645–1815, "Prince of Brazil" was always conferred on the heir apparent of the throne, who also received the title of Duke of Braganza. The title was abolished when Brazil became independent and joined the United Kingdom of Portugal.

Brazil would later break from the United Kingdom and become the independent Empire of Brazil.  The heirs presumptive of Brazil were known as Prince Imperial of Brazil or Princess Imperial of Brazil, with the style of Imperial Highness. Other members of the Brazilian Imperial Family were known by the title of Prince or Princess prefixed to their given names, with the style of Highness. The Portuguese title of Prince of Brazil, that existed as a title of the Portuguese heir apparent only while Brazil was still a possession of Portugal, should therefore not be confused with the later ranks of Brazilian Prince or Brazilian Princess, that stem from the era of the Empire of Brazil.

By birth

This is a list of Princess of Brazil who held the title by their own rights:

By marriage

This is a list of Princess of Brazil who held the title by their marriage to the Prince of Brazil:

Notes

See also
List of Brazilian consorts
List of Portuguese consorts
Princess of Portugal
Princess Royal of Portugal
Princess of Beira

 
Brazil
Brazil